The 90th Ohio Infantry Regiment, sometimes 90th Ohio Volunteer Infantry (or 90th OVI) was an infantry regiment in the Union Army during the American Civil War.

Service
The 90th Ohio Infantry was organized at Camp Circleville near Lancaster, Ohio and mustered in for three years service on August 29, 1862, under the command of Colonel Isaac N. Ross.  The regiment was recruited in Fairfield, Fayette, Hocking, Perry, Pickaway, and Vinton counties.

The regiment was attached to 22nd Brigade, 4th Division, Army of the Ohio, September 1862. 22nd Brigade, 4th Division, II Corps, Army of the Ohio, to November 1862. 1st Brigade, 2nd Division, Left Wing, XIV Corps, Army of the Cumberland, to January 1863. 1st Brigade, 2nd Division, XXI Corps, Army of the Cumberland, to October 1863. 1st Brigade, 1st Division, IV Corps, Army of the Cumberland, to June 1865.

The 90th Ohio Infantry mustered out of service on June 13, 1865, at Camp Dennison near Cincinnati, Ohio and was discharged on June 21, 1865.

Detailed service
Ordered to Covington, Ky., August 30, thence to relief of Lexington September 1. Retreat to Louisville, Ky., September 2–15. Pursuit of Bragg to London, Ky., October 1–22, 1862. Battle of Perryville, Ky., October 8. At Glasgow, Ky., until November 8. March to Nashville, Tenn., and duty there until December 26. Advance on Murfreesboro, Tenn., December 26–30. Lavergne December 26–27. Battle of Stones River December 30–31, 1862 and January 1–3, 1863. Duty at Murfreesboro until June. Expedition to Woodbury April 2. Tullahoma Campaign June 23-July 7. Occupation of middle Tennessee until August 18. Passage of Cumberland Mountains and Tennessee River, and Chickamauga Campaign August 16-September 22. Lee and Gordon's Mills September 11–13. Battle of Chickamauga September 19–20. Siege of Chattanooga, September 24-October 26. Moved to Bridgeport, Ala., October 26, and duty there until January 24, 1864. At Ooltewah, Tenn., until May. Atlanta Campaign May 1-September 8. Tunnel Hill May 6–7. Demonstrations on Rocky Faced Ridge and Dalton May 8–13. Buzzard's Roost Gap May 8–9. Battle of Resaca May 14–15. Near Kingston May 18–19. Near Cassville May 19. Advance on Dallas May 22–25. Operations on line of Pumpkin Vine Creek and battles about Dallas, New Hope Church and Allatoona Hills May 25-June 5. Operations about Marietta and against Kennesaw Mountain June 10-July 2. Pine Hill June 11–14. Lost Mountain June 15–17. Assault on Kennesaw June 27. Ruff's Station, Smyrna Camp Ground, July 4. Chattahoochie River July 5–17. Peachtree Creek July 19–20. Siege of Atlanta July 22-August 25. Flank movement on Jonesboro August 25–30. Battle of Jonesboro August 31-September 1. Lovejoy's Station September 2–6. Duty at Atlanta until October 3. Operations against Hood in northern Georgia and northern Alabama October 3-November 3. Moved to Pulaski, Tenn. Nashville Campaign November–December. Columbia, Duck River, November 24–27. Battle of Franklin November 30. Battle of Nashville December 15–16. Pursuit of Hood to the Tennessee River December 17–28. Moved to Huntsville, Ala., and duty there until March 1865. Operations in eastern Tennessee March 15-April 22. Moved to Nashville, Tenn., and duty there until June.

Casualties
The regiment lost a total of 252 men during service; 5 officers and 77 enlisted men killed or mortally wounded, 170 enlisted men died of disease.

Commanders
 Colonel Isaac N. Ross
 Colonel Charles H. Rippey
 Lieutenant Colonel Samuel N. Yeoman - commanded at the battle of Nashville

See also

 List of Ohio Civil War units
 Ohio in the Civil War

References
 Dyer, Frederick H. A Compendium of the War of the Rebellion (Des Moines, IA:  Dyer Pub. Co.), 1908.
 Harden, H. O.  History of the 90th Ohio Volunteer Infantry in the War of the Great Rebellion in the United States, 1861 to 1865 (Kent, OH:  Black Squirrel Books), 2006.   [originally printed in 1902]
 Ohio Roster Commission. Official Roster of the Soldiers of the State of Ohio in the War on the Rebellion, 1861–1865, Compiled Under the Direction of the Roster Commission (Akron, OH: Werner Co.), 1886–1895.
 Reid, Whitelaw. Ohio in the War: Her Statesmen, Her Generals, and Soldiers (Cincinnati, OH: Moore, Wilstach, & Baldwin), 1868. 
Attribution

External links
 Ohio in the Civil War: 90th Ohio Volunteer Infantry by Larry Stevens
 National flag of the 90th Ohio Infantry

Military units and formations established in 1862
Military units and formations disestablished in 1865
Units and formations of the Union Army from Ohio
1862 establishments in Ohio